Abu Bakr Muhammad (died 941) was the first Muhtajid ruler of Chaghaniyan (until 939) and governor of Samanid Khurasan (933–939). He was the son of Muzaffar ibn Muhtaj.

Origins 
The origin of the Muhtajids is unknown.  The name has been given by modern historians after their presumed forebear Muhtaj ( Muḥtāj). They may have been descended from the Chaghan Khudahs, who ruled Chaghaniyan during the early Middle Ages.  Another possibility is that their ancestors were Arabs who migrated to the region and were Iranicized. In any case, by the early 10th century Chaghaniyan had become a vassal to the Samanids of Bukhara.

Biography 
Abu Bakr Muhammad was the first ruler fully attested in sources. Under the Samanids, he was the governor of Ferghana. When in 929 the Samanid amir Nasr II was temporarily expelled from power by his brothers, Muhammad remained loyal to him. As a result, when Nasr managed to regained power, he rewarded Muhammad with the governorship of Balkh, and then in 933 made him governor of Khurasan. During his time as governor of Khurasan, Muhammad battled various Dailamite bands in northern Iran. In 939 he fell ill and was replaced in his post by his son Abu 'Ali Chaghani.  Abu Bakr Muhammad died in 941.

Sources 
Bosworth, C. E. "Al-e Mohtaj." Encyclopedia Iranica. 22 September 2006. <http://www.iranicaonline.org/articles/al-e-mohtaj-a-local-dynasty>
 

941 deaths
Year of birth unknown
10th-century monarchs in Asia
10th-century Iranian people
Monarchs of Chaghaniyan
Samanid generals
Samanid governors of Khorasan